

Peerage of England

|rowspan="2"|Duke of Cornwall (1337)||none||1649||1688||
|-
|Prince James Francis Edward||1688||1702||
|-
|rowspan="2"|Duke of Norfolk (1483)||Henry Howard, 6th Duke of Norfolk||1677||1684||Died
|-
|Henry Howard, 7th Duke of Norfolk||1684||1701||
|-
|Duke of Somerset (1547)||Charles Seymour, 6th Duke of Somerset||1678||1748||
|-
|Duke of Buckingham (1623)||George Villiers, 2nd Duke of Buckingham||1628||1687||Died, title extinct
|-
|Duke of Cumberland (1644)||Prince Rupert of the Rhine||1644||1682||Died, title extinct
|-
|Duke of York (1644)||James Stuart||1644||1685||Succeeded to the Throne, and his titles merged in the Crown
|-
|Duke of Albemarle (1660)||Christopher Monck, 2nd Duke of Albemarle||1670||1688||Died, title extinct
|-
|Duke of Monmouth (1663)||James Scott, 1st Duke of Monmouth||1663||1685||Attainted, and his titles were forfeited
|-
|Duke of Newcastle-upon-Tyne (1665)||Henry Cavendish, 2nd Duke of Newcastle-upon-Tyne||1676||1691||
|-
|Duke of Cleveland (1670)||Barbara Palmer, 1st Duchess of Cleveland||1670||1709||
|-
|Duke of Portsmouth (1673)||Louise de Kérouaille, Duchess of Portsmouth||1673||1734||
|-
|Duke of Richmond (1675)||Charles Lennox, 1st Duke of Richmond||1675||1723||
|-
|Duke of Southampton (1675)||Charles Fitzroy, 1st Duke of Southampton||1675||1730||
|-
|Duke of Grafton (1675)||Henry FitzRoy, 1st Duke of Grafton||1675||1690||
|-
|Duke of Ormonde (1682)||James Butler, 1st Duke of Ormonde||1682||1715||New creation; also Duke of Ormonde in the Peerage of Ireland
|-
|Duke of Beaufort (1682)||Henry Somerset, 1st Duke of Beaufort||1682||1700||New creation for the 3rd Marquess of Worcester
|-
|Duke of Northumberland (1683)||George FitzRoy, 1st Duke of Northumberland||1683||1716||New creation
|-
|Duke of St Albans (1684)||Charles Beauclerk, 1st Duke of St Albans||1684||1726||New creation
|-
|Duke of Berwick (1687)||James FitzJames, 1st Duke of Berwick||1687||1695||New creation
|-
|Duke of Cumberland (1689)||Prince George, Duke of Cumberland||1689||1708||New creation
|-
|Duke of Bolton (1689)||Charles Paulet, 1st Duke of Bolton||1689||1699||New creation; 6th Marquess of Winchester
|-
|Duke of Schomberg (1689)||Frederick Schomberg, 1st Duke of Schomberg||1689||1690||New creation
|-
|Marquess of Dorchester (1645)||Henry Pierrepont, 1st Marquess of Dorchester||1645||1680||Died, title extinct; Earldom of Kingston-upon-Hull succeeded by a cousin, see below
|-
|Marquess of Halifax (1682)||George Savile, 1st Marquess of Halifax||1682||1695||New creation
|-
|Marquess of Powis (1687)||William Herbert, 1st Marquess of Powis||1687||1696||New creation
|-
|Marquess of Carmarthen (1689)||Thomas Osborne, 1st Marquess of Carmarthen||1689||1712||New creation
|-
|Earl of Oxford (1142)||Aubrey de Vere, 20th Earl of Oxford||1632||1703||
|-
|Earl of Shrewsbury (1442)||Charles Talbot, 12th Earl of Shrewsbury||1668||1718||
|-
|Earl of Kent (1465)||Anthony Grey, 11th Earl of Kent||1651||1702||
|-
|Earl of Derby (1485)||William Stanley, 9th Earl of Derby||1672||1702||
|-
|Earl of Rutland (1525)||John Manners, 9th Earl of Rutlan||1679||1711||
|-
|Earl of Huntingdon (1529)||Theophilus Hastings, 7th Earl of Huntingdon||1656||1701||
|-
|Earl of Bedford (1550)||William Russell, 5th Earl of Bedford||1641||1700||
|-
|rowspan="2"|Earl of Pembroke (1551)||Philip Herbert, 7th Earl of Pembroke||1674||1683||Died
|-
|Thomas Herbert, 8th Earl of Pembroke||1683||1733||
|-
|Earl of Devon (1553)||William Courtenay, de jure 5th Earl of Devon||1638||1702||
|-
|Earl of Lincoln (1572)||Edward Clinton, 5th Earl of Lincoln||1667||1692||
|-
|Earl of Nottingham (1596)||Charles Howard, 3rd Earl of Nottingham||1642||1681||Died, title extinct
|-
|rowspan="2"|Earl of Suffolk (1603)||James Howard, 3rd Earl of Suffolk||1640||1689||Died
|-
|George Howard, 4th Earl of Suffolk||1689||1691||
|-
|Earl of Dorset (1604)||Charles Sackville, 6th Earl of Dorset||1677||1706||
|-
|Earl of Exeter (1605)||John Cecil, 5th Earl of Exeter||1678||1700||
|-
|rowspan="2"|Earl of Salisbury (1605)||James Cecil, 3rd Earl of Salisbury||1668||1683||Died
|-
|James Cecil, 4th Earl of Salisbury||1683||1694||
|-
|rowspan="2"|Earl of Bridgewater (1617)||John Egerton, 2nd Earl of Bridgewater||1649||1686||Died
|-
|John Egerton, 3rd Earl of Bridgewater||1686||1701||
|-
|rowspan="2"|Earl of Northampton (1618)||James Compton, 3rd Earl of Northampton||1643||1681||Died
|-
|George Compton, 4th Earl of Northampton||1681||1727||
|-
|Earl of Leicester (1618)||Philip Sidney, 3rd Earl of Leicester||1677||1698||
|-
|Earl of Warwick (1618)||Edward Rich, 6th Earl of Warwick||1675||1701||
|-
|rowspan="2"|Earl of Devonshire (1618)||William Cavendish, 3rd Earl of Devonshire||1628||1684||Died
|-
|William Cavendish, 4th Earl of Devonshire||1684||1707||
|-
|rowspan="2"|Earl of Denbigh (1622)||William Feilding, 3rd Earl of Denbigh||1675||1685||Died
|-
|Basil Feilding, 4th Earl of Denbigh||1685||1717||
|-
|Earl of Bristol (1622)||John Digby, 3rd Earl of Bristol||1677||1698||
|-
|rowspan="2"|Earl of Clare (1624)||Gilbert Holles, 3rd Earl of Clare||1666||1689||Died
|-
|John Holles, 4th Earl of Clare||1689||1711||
|-
|rowspan="2"|Earl of Bolingbroke (1624)||Oliver St John, 2nd Earl of Bolingbroke||1646||1688||Died
|-
|Paulet St John, 3rd Earl of Bolingbroke||1688||1711||
|-
|Earl of Westmorland (1624)||Charles Fane, 3rd Earl of Westmorland||1666||1691||
|-
|rowspan="2"|Earl of Manchester (1626)||Robert Montagu, 3rd Earl of Manchester||1671||1683||Died
|-
|Charles Montagu, 4th Earl of Manchester||1683||1722||
|-
|Earl of Mulgrave (1626)||John Sheffield, 3rd Earl of Mulgrave||1658||1721||
|-
|Earl of Berkshire (1626)||Thomas Howard, 3rd Earl of Berkshire||1679||1706||
|-
|Earl Rivers (1626)||Thomas Savage, 3rd Earl Rivers||1654||1694||
|-
|Earl of Lindsey (1626)||Robert Bertie, 3rd Earl of Lindsey||1666||1701||
|-
|Earl of Peterborough (1628)||Henry Mordaunt, 2nd Earl of Peterborough||1643||1697||
|-
|Earl of Stamford (1628)||Thomas Grey, 2nd Earl of Stamford||1673||1720||
|-
|rowspan="2"|Earl of Winchilsea (1628)||Heneage Finch, 3rd Earl of Winchilsea||1639||1689||Died
|-
|Charles Finch, 4th Earl of Winchilsea||1689||1712||
|-
|rowspan="2"|Earl of Kingston-upon-Hull (1628)||Robert Pierrepont, 3rd Earl of Kingston-upon-Hull||1680||1682||Died
|-
|William Pierrepont, 4th Earl of Kingston-upon-Hull||1682||1690||
|-
|Earl of Carnarvon (1628)||Charles Dormer, 2nd Earl of Carnarvon||1643||1709||
|-
|Earl of Chesterfield (1628)||Philip Stanhope, 2nd Earl of Chesterfield||1656||1714||
|-
|rowspan="3"|Earl of Thanet (1628)||John Tufton, 4th Earl of Thanet||1679||1680||Died
|-
|Richard Tufton, 5th Earl of Thanet||1680||1684||Died
|-
|Thomas Tufton, 6th Earl of Thanet||1684||1729||
|-
|Earl of Portland (1633)||Thomas Weston, 4th Earl of Portland||1665||1668||Died, title extinct
|-
|Earl of Strafford (1640)||William Wentworth, 2nd Earl of Strafford||1662||1695||
|-
|Earl of Sunderland (1643)||Robert Spencer, 2nd Earl of Sunderland||1643||1702||
|-
|rowspan="2"|Earl of Scarsdale (1645)||Nicholas Leke, 2nd Earl of Scarsdale||1655||1681||Died
|-
|Robert Leke, 3rd Earl of Scarsdale||1681||1707||
|-
|rowspan="2"|Earl of Rochester (1652)||John Wilmot, 2nd Earl of Rochester||1658||1680||Died
|-
|Charles Wilmot, 3rd Earl of Rochester||1680||1681||Died, title extinct
|-
|Earl of St Albans (1660)||Henry Jermyn, 1st Earl of St Albans||1660||1684||Died, title extinct
|-
|rowspan="2"|Earl of Sandwich (1660)||Edward Montagu, 2nd Earl of Sandwich||1672||1688||Died
|-
|Edward Montagu, 3rd Earl of Sandwich||1688||1729||
|-
|Earl of Brecknock (1660)||James Butler, 1st Earl of Brecknock||1660||1688||Created Duke of Ormonde, see above
|-
|rowspan="2"|Earl of Anglesey (1661)||Arthur Annesley, 1st Earl of Anglesey||1661||1686||Died
|-
|James Annesley, 2nd Earl of Anglesey||1686||1690||
|-
|Earl of Bath (1661)||John Granville, 1st Earl of Bath||1661||1701||
|-
|Earl of Cardigan (1661)||Robert Brudenell, 2nd Earl of Cardigan||1663||1703||
|-
|Earl of Clarendon (1661)||Henry Hyde, 2nd Earl of Clarendon||1674||1709||
|-
|rowspan="2"|Earl of Essex (1661)||Arthur Capell, 1st Earl of Essex||1661||1683||Died
|-
|Algernon Capell, 2nd Earl of Essex||1683||1710||
|-
|rowspan="2"|Earl of Carlisle (1661)||Charles Howard, 1st Earl of Carlisle||1661||1685||Died
|-
|Edward Howard, 2nd Earl of Carlisle||1685||1692||
|-
|Earl of Craven (1664)||William Craven, 1st Earl of Craven||1664||1697||
|-
|rowspan="2"|Earl of Ailesbury (1664)||Robert Bruce, 1st Earl of Ailesbury||1664||1685||Earl of Elgin in the Peerage of Scotland; died
|-
|Thomas Bruce, 2nd Earl of Ailesbury||1685||1741||Earl of Elgin in the Peerage of Scotland
|-
|Earl of Burlington (1664)||Richard Boyle, 1st Earl of Burlington||1664||1698||Earl of Cork in the Peerage of Ireland
|-
|rowspan="2"|Earl of Arlington (1672)||Henry Bennet, 1st Earl of Arlington||1672||1685||Died
|-
|Isabella Fitzroy, 2nd Countess of Arlington||1685||1723||
|-
|rowspan="2"|Earl of Shaftesbury (1672)||Anthony Ashley Cooper, 1st Earl of Shaftesbury||1672||1683||Died
|-
|Anthony Ashley-Cooper, 2nd Earl of Shaftesbury||1683||1699||
|-
|Earl of Powis (1674)||William Herbert, 1st Earl of Powis||1674||1696||Created Marquess of Powis, see above
|-
|Earl of Lichfield (1674)||Edward Lee, 1st Earl of Lichfield||1674||1716||
|-
|Earl of Guilford (1674)||John Maitland, 1st Earl of Guildford||1674||1682||Died, title extinct
|-
|Earl of Danby (1674)||Thomas Osborne, 1st Earl of Danby||1674||1712||Created Marquess of Carmarthen, see above
|-
|Earl of Northumberland (1674)||George FitzRoy, 1st Earl of Northumberland||1674||1716||Created Duke of Northumberland, see above
|-
|Earl of Sussex (1674)||Thomas Lennard, 1st Earl of Sussex||1674||1715||
|-
|Earl of Plymouth (1675)||Charles FitzCharles, 1st Earl of Plymouth||1675||1680||Died, title extinct
|-
|Earl of Feversham (1676)||Louis de Duras, 2nd Earl of Feversham||1677||1709||
|-
|Earl of Burford (1676)||Charles Beauclerk, 1st Earl of Burford||1676||1726||Created Duke of St Albans, see above
|-
|Earl of Conway (1679)||Edward Conway, 1st Earl of Conway||1679||1683||Died, title extinct
|-
|Earl of Halifax (1679)||George Savile, 1st Earl of Halifax||1679||1695||Created Marquess of Halifax, see above
|-
|rowspan="2"|Earl of Radnor (1679)||John Robartes, 1st Earl of Radnor||1679||1685||Died
|-
|Charles Robartes, 2nd Earl of Radnor||1685||1723||
|-
|Earl of Macclesfield (1679)||Charles Gerard, 1st Earl of Macclesfield||1679||1694||
|-
|rowspan="2"|Earl of Yarmouth (1679)||Robert Paston, 1st Earl of Yarmouth||1679||1683||Died
|-
|William Paston, 2nd Earl of Yarmouth||1683||1732||
|-
|Earl of Berkeley (1679)||George Berkeley, 1st Earl of Berkeley||1679||1698||
|-
|Earl of Shepey (1680)||Elizabeth Walter, Countess of Shepey||1680||1686||New creation, for life only; died, title extinct
|-
|rowspan="2"|Earl of Nottingham (1681)||Heneage Finch, 1st Earl of Nottingham||1681||1682||New creation; died
|-
|Daniel Finch, 2nd Earl of Nottingham||1682||1730||
|-
|Earl of Rochester (1682)||Laurence Hyde, 1st Earl of Rochester||1682||1711||New creation; Viscount Hyde in 1681
|-
|Earl of Abingdon (1682)||James Bertie, 1st Earl of Abingdon||1682||1699||New creation
|-
|rowspan="2"|Earl of Gainsborough (1682)||Edward Noel, 1st Earl of Gainsborough||1682||1689||New creation; died
|-
|Wriothesley Noel, 2nd Earl of Gainsborough||1689||1690||
|-
|rowspan="2"|Earl of Plymouth (1682)||Thomas Hickman-Windsor, 1st Earl of Plymouth||1682||1687||New creation; died
|-
|Other Windsor, 2nd Earl of Plymouth||1687||1727||
|-
|rowspan="2"|Earl of Holderness (1682)||Conyers Darcy, 1st Earl of Holderness||1682||1689||New creation; died
|-
|Conyers Darcy, 2nd Earl of Holderness||1689||1692||
|-
|Earl of Dorchester (1686)||Catherine Sedley, Countess of Dorchester||1686||1717||New creation, for life only
|-
|Earl of Derwentwater (1688)||Francis Radclyffe, 1st Earl of Derwentwater||1688||1697||New creation
|-
|Earl of Stafford (1688)||Mary Stafford, Countess of Stafford||1688||1694||New creation, for life only
|-
|Earl of Stafford (1688)||Henry Stafford Howard, 1st Earl of Stafford||1688||1719||New creation
|-
|Earl of Fauconberg (1689)||Thomas Belasyse, 1st Earl Fauconberg||1689||1700||New creation
|-
|Earl of Marlborough (1689)||John Churchill, 1st Earl of Marlborough||1689||1722||New creation; created Baron Churchill in 1685
|-
|Earl of Montagu (1689)||Ralph Montagu, 1st Earl of Montagu||1689||1709||New creation
|-
|Earl of Portland (1689)||William Bentinck, 1st Earl of Portland||1689||1709||New creation
|-
|Earl of Monmouth (1689)||Charles Mordaunt, 1st Earl of Monmouth||1689||1735||New creation
|-
|Earl of Torrington (1689)||Arthur Herbert, 1st Earl of Torrington||1689||1716||New creation
|-
|rowspan="2"|Viscount Hereford (1550)||Leicester Devereux, 7th Viscount Hereford||1676||1683||Died
|-
|Edward Devereux, 8th Viscount Hereford||1683||1700||
|-
|rowspan="2"|Viscount Montagu (1554)||Francis Browne, 3rd Viscount Montagu||1629||1682||Died
|-
|Francis Browne, 4th Viscount Montagu||1682||1708||
|-
|Viscount Saye and Sele (1624)||William Fiennes, 3rd Viscount Saye and Sele||1674||1698||
|-
|rowspan="2"|Viscount Campden (1628)||Baptist Noel, 3rd Viscount Campden||1643||1682||
|-
|Edward Noel, 4th Viscount Campden||1682||1689||Creataed Earl of Gainsborough, see above; created Baron Noel in 1681
|-
|Viscount Stafford (1640)||William Howard, 1st Viscount Stafford||1640||1680||Attainted, and his honours forfeited
|-
|Viscount Fauconberg (1643)||Thomas Belasyse, 2nd Viscount Fauconberg||1652||1700||Created Earl of Fauconberg, see above
|-
|Viscount Mordaunt (1659)||Charles Mordaunt, 2nd Viscount Mordaunt||1675||1735||Created Earl of Monmouth, see above
|-
|Viscount Bayning of Newport (1675)||Francis Newport, 1st Viscount Newport||1675||1708||
|-
|Viscount Corbet of Linchlade (1679)||Sarah Corbet, Viscountess Corbet of Linchlade||1679||1682||Died, title extinct
|-
|Viscount Hatton (1682)||Christopher Hatton, 1st Viscount Hatton||1682||1706||New creation
|-
|rowspan="2"|Viscount Townshend (1682)||Horatio Townshend, 1st Viscount Townshend||1682||1687||New creation; died
|-
|Charles Townshend, 2nd Viscount Townshend||1687||1738||
|-
|Viscount Weymouth (1682)||Thomas Thynne, 1st Viscount Weymouth||1682||1714||New creation
|-
|Viscount Lumley (1689)||Richard Lumley, 1st Viscount Lumley||1689||1721||New creation; cr. Baron Lumley in 1681
|-
|Viscount Sydney (1689)||Henry Sydney, 1st Viscount Sydney||1689||1704||New creation
|-
|Baron FitzWalter (1295)||Charles Mildmay, 18th Baron FitzWalter||1679||1728||
|- 
|Baron Ferrers of Chartley (1299)||Robert Shirley, 14th Baron Ferrers of Chartley||1677||1717||
|- 
|Baron Morley (1299)||Thomas Parker, 15th Baron Morley||1655||1697||
|- 
|Baron Grey of Ruthyn (1325)||Henry Yelverton, 15th Baron Grey of Ruthyn||1679||1704||
|- 
|Baron Darcy de Knayth (1332)||Conyers Darcy, 8th Baron Darcy de Knayth||1653||1689||Created Earl of Holderness in 1682; Barony held by his heirs until 1778
|- 
|Baron Dudley (1440)||Frances Ward, 6th Baroness Dudley||1643||1697||
|- 
|rowspan="2"|Baron Stourton (1448)||William Stourton, 12th Baron Stourton||1672||1685||Died
|- 
|Edward Stourton, 13th Baron Stourton||1685||1720||
|- 
|rowspan="2"|Baron Willoughby de Broke (1491)||William Verney, 10th Baron Willoughby de Broke||1668||1683||Died
|- 
|Richard Verney, 11th Baron Willoughby de Broke||1683||1711||
|- 
|Baron Monteagle (1514)||Thomas Parker, 6th Baron Monteagle||1655||1697||
|-
|rowspan="2"|Baron Sandys of the Vine (1529)||Henry Sandys, 7th Baron Sandys||1668||1680||Died
|-
|Edwin Sandys, 8th Baron Sandys||1680||1683||Died, Barony fell into abeyance
|-
|Baron Windsor (1529)||Thomas Hickman-Windsor, 7th Baron Windsor||1660||1687||Created Earl of Plymouth in 1682, see above
|-
|rowspan="2"|Baron Wentworth (1529)||Henrietta Wentworth, 6th Baroness Wentworth||1667||1686||Died
|-
|Anne Lovelace, 7th Baroness Wentworth||1686||1697||
|-
|Baron Eure (1544)||Ralph Eure, 7th Baron Eure||1672||1707||
|-
|Baron Wharton (1545)||Philip Wharton, 4th Baron Wharton||1625||1695||
|-
|rowspan="2"|Baron Willoughby of Parham (1547)||Henry Willoughby, de jure 11th Baron Willoughby of Parham||1679||1685||Died
|-
|Henry Willoughby, de jure 12th Baron Willoughby of Parham||1685||1722||
|-
|Baron Paget (1552)||William Paget, 6th Baron Paget||1678||1713||
|-
|Baron North (1554)||Charles North, 5th Baron North||1677||1691||
|-
|Baron Howard of Effingham (1554)||Francis Howard, 5th Baron Howard of Effingham||1681||1695||Title previously held by the Earls of Nottingham
|-
|Baron Chandos (1554)||James Brydges, 8th Baron Chandos||1676||1714||
|-
|Baron Hunsdon (1559)||Robert Carey, 6th Baron Hunsdon||1677||1692||
|-
|rowspan="2"|Baron De La Warr (1570)||Charles West, 5th Baron De La Warr||1628||1687||Died
|-
|John West, 6th Baron De La Warr||1687||1723||
|-
|Baron Norreys (1572)||James Bertie, 5th Baron Norreys||1657||1699||Created Earl of Abingdon in 1682, see above
|-
|rowspan="2"|Baron Gerard (1603)||Digby Gerard, 5th Baron Gerard||1667||1684||Died
|-
|Charles Gerard, 6th Baron Gerard||1684||1707||
|-
|rowspan="2"|Baron Petre (1603)||William Petre, 4th Baron Petre||1638||1684||Died
|-
|John Petre, 5th Baron Petre||1684||1684||Died
|-
|Thomas Petre, 6th Baron Petre||1684||1706||
|-
|Baron Arundell of Wardour (1605)||Henry Arundell, 3rd Baron Arundell of Wardour||1643||1694||
|-
|Baron Clifton (1608)||Katherine O'Brien, 7th Baroness Clifton||1672||1702||
|-
|rowspan="2"|Baron Teynham (1616)||Christopher Roper, 5th Baron Teynham||1673||1689||Died
|-
|John Roper, 6th Baron Teynham||1689||1697||
|-
|Baron Brooke (1621)||Fulke Greville, 5th Baron Brooke||1677||1710||
|-
|rowspan="2"|Baron Montagu of Boughton (1621)||Edward Montagu, 2nd Baron Montagu of Boughton||1644||1684||Died
|-
|Ralph Montagu, 3rd Baron Montagu of Boughton||1644||1684||Created Earl of Montagu, see above
|-
|Baron Grey of Warke (1624)||Ford Grey, 3rd Baron Grey of Werke||1674||1701||
|-
|Baron Lovelace (1627)||John Lovelace, 3rd Baron Lovelace||1670||1693||
|-
|Baron Poulett (1627)||John Poulett, 4th Baron Poulett||1679||1743||
|-
|Baron Clifford (1628)||Elizabeth Boyle, Baroness Clifford||1643||1691||
|-
|Baron Maynard (1628)||William Maynard, 2nd Baron Maynard||1640||1699||
|-
|rowspan="3"|Baron Coventry (1628)||George Coventry, 3rd Baron Coventry||1661||1680||Died
|-
|John Coventry, 4th Baron Coventry||1680||1687||Died
|-
|Thomas Coventry, 5th Baron Coventry||1687||1699||
|-
|Baron Mohun of Okehampton (1628)||Charles Mohun, 4th Baron Mohun of Okehampton||1677||1712||
|-
|Baron Herbert of Chirbury (1629)||Henry Herbert, 4th Baron Herbert of Chirbury||1678||1691||
|-
|Baron Hatton (1642)||Christopher Hatton, 2nd Baron Hatton||1670||1706||Created Viscount Hatton in 1683, see above
|-
|Baron Leigh (1643)||Thomas Leigh, 2nd Baron Leigh||1672||1710||
|-
|Baron Jermyn (1643)||Thomas Jermyn, 2nd Baron Jermyn||1684||1703||Title previously held by the Earl of St Albans
|-
|Baron Byron (1643)||William Byron, 3rd Baron Byron||1679||1695||
|-
|Baron Widdrington (1643)||William Widdrington, 3rd Baron Widdrington||1675||1695||
|-
|Baron Ward (1644)||Edward Ward, 2nd Baron Ward||1670||1701||
|-
|rowspan="2"|Baron Colepeper (1644)||Thomas Colepeper, 2nd Baron Colepeper||1660||1689||Died
|-
|John Colepeper, 3rd Baron of Colepeper||1689||1719||
|-
|Baron Astley of Reading (1644)||Jacob Astley, 3rd Baron Astley of Reading||1662||1688||Died, title extinct
|-
|rowspan="2"|Baron Lucas of Shenfield (1645)||Charles Lucas, 2nd Baron Lucas of Shenfield||1671||1688||Died
|-
|Robert Lucas, 3rd Baron Lucas of Shenfield||1688||1705||
|-
|rowspan="2"|Baron Belasyse (1645)||John Belasyse, 1st Baron Belasyse||1645||1689||Died
|-
|Henry Belasyse, 2nd Baron Belasyse||1689||1691||
|-
|rowspan="2"|Baron Rockingham (1645)||Edward Watson, 2nd Baron Rockingham||1653||1689||Died
|-
|Lewis Watson, 3rd Baron Rockingham||1689||1724||
|-
|Baron Lexinton (1645)||Robert Sutton, 2nd Baron Lexinton||1668||1723||
|-
|Baron Wotton (1650)||Charles Kirkhoven, 1st Baron Wotton||1650||1683||Created Earl of Bellomont in the Peerage of Ireland; died, both titles extinct
|-
|Baron Langdale (1658)||Marmaduke Langdale, 2nd Baron Langdale||1661||1703||
|-
|rowspan="2"|Baron Berkeley of Stratton (1658)||Charles Berkeley, 2nd Baron Berkeley of Stratton||1678||1681||Died
|-
|John Berkeley, 3rd Baron Berkeley of Stratton||1681||1697||
|-
|Baron Cornwallis (1661)||Charles Cornwallis, 3rd Baron Cornwallis||1673||1698||
|-
|Baron Crew (1661)||Thomas Crew, 2nd Baron Crew||1679||1697||
|-
|rowspan="2"|Baron Delamer (1661)||George Booth, 1st Baron Delamer||1661||1684||Died
|-
|Henry Booth, 2nd Baron Delamer||1684||1694||
|-
|rowspan="2"|Baron Holles (1661)||Denzil Holles, 1st Baron Holles||1661||1680||Died
|-
|Francis Holles, 2nd Baron Holles||1680||1690||
|-
|Baron Townshend (1661)||Horatio Townshend, 1st Baron Townshend||1661||1687||Created Viscount Townshend in 1682, see above
|-
|Baron (A)bergavenny (1662)||George Nevill, 12th Baron Bergavenny||1666||1695||
|-
|Baron Lucas of Crudwell (1663)||Mary Grey, 1st Baroness Lucas||1663||1702||
|-
|rowspan="2"|Baron Arundell of Trerice (1664)||Richard Arundell, 1st Baron Arundell of Trerice||1664||1687||Died
|-
|John Arundell, 2nd Baron Arundell of Trerice||1687||1698||
|-
|Baron Frescheville (1665)||John Frescheville, 1st Baron Frescheville||1665||1682||Died, title extinct
|-
|Baron Clifford of Chudleigh (1672)||Hugh Clifford, 2nd Baron Clifford of Chudleigh||1673||1730||
|-
|Baron Finch (1674)||Heneage Finch, 1st Baron Finch||1674||1682||Created Earl of Nottingham in 1681, see above
|-
|Baron Belasyse of Osgodby (1674)||Susan Belasyse, Baroness Belasyse||1674||1713||
|-
|Baron Willoughby of Parham (1680)||Thomas Willoughby, 11th Baron Willoughby of Parham||1680||1692||New creation
|-
|Baron Carteret (1681)||George Carteret, 1st Baron Carteret||1681||1695||New creation
|-
|Baron Ossulston (1682)||John Bennet, 1st Baron Ossulston||1682||1695||New creation
|-
|Baron Dartmouth (1682)||George Legge, 1st Baron Dartmouth||1682||1691||New creation
|-
|rowspan="2"|Baron Stawell (1683)||Ralph Stawell, 1st Baron Stawell||1683||1689||New creation; died
|-
|John Stawell, 2nd Baron Stawell||1689||1692||
|-
|rowspan="2"|Baron Guilford (1683)||Francis North, 1st Baron Guilford||1683||1685||New creation; died
|-
|Francis North, 2nd Baron Guilford||1685||1729||
|-
|Baron Godolphin (1684)||Sidney Godolphin, 1st Baron Godolphin||1684||1712||New creation
|-
|rowspan="2"|Baron Jeffreys (1685)||George Jeffreys, 1st Baron Jeffreys||1685||1689||
|-
|John Jeffreys, 2nd Baron Jeffreys||1689||1702||
|-
|rowspan="2"|Baron Waldegrave (1686)||Henry Waldegrave, 1st Baron Waldegrave||1686||1689||New creation, died
|-
|James Waldegrave, 2nd Baron Waldegrave||1689||1741||
|-
|Baron Griffin (1688)||Edward Griffin, 1st Baron Griffin||1688||1710||New creation
|-
|Baron Ashburnham (1689)||John Ashburnham, 1st Baron Ashburnham||1689||1710||New creation
|-
|Baron Cholmondeley (1689)||Hugh Cholmondeley, 1st Baron Cholmondeley||1689||1725||New creation
|-
|}

Peerage of Scotland

|Duke of Rothesay (1398)||James Stuart, Duke of Rothesay||1688||1702||
|-
|Duke of Hamilton (1643)||Anne Hamilton, 3rd Duchess of Hamilton||1651||1698||
|-
|Duke of Albany (1660)||Prince James, Duke of Albany||1660||1685||Acceeded to the Throne of England and Scotland
|-
|Duke of Buccleuch (1663)||Anne Scott, 1st Duchess of Buccleuch||1663||1732||
|-
|Duke of Lauderdale (1672)||John Maitland, 1st Duke of Lauderdale||1672||1682||Died, title extinct
|-
|Duke of Lennox (1675)||Charles Lennox, 1st Duke of Lennox||1675||1723||
|-
|Duke of Rothes (1680)||John Leslie, 1st Duke of Rothes||1680||1681||New creation; died, title extinct
|-
|Duke of Queensberry (1684)||William Douglas, 1st Duke of Queensberry||1684||1695||New creation; also Marquess of Quensberry in 1682
|-
|Duke of Gordon (1684)||George Gordon, 1st Duke of Gordon||1684||1716||New creation
|-
|Marquess of Huntly (1599)||George Gordon, 4th Marquess of Huntly||1653||1716||Created of Gordon, see above
|-
|Marquess of Douglas (1633)||James Douglas, 2nd Marquess of Douglas||1660||1700||
|-
|rowspan=2|Marquess of Montrose (1644)||James Graham, 3rd Marquess of Montrose||1669||1684||Died
|-
|James Graham, 4th Marquess of Montrose||1684||1742||
|-
|Marquess of Atholl (1676)||John Murray, 1st Marquess of Atholl||1676||1703||
|-
|rowspan=2|Earl of Argyll (1457)||Archibald Campbell, 9th Earl of Argyll||1663||1685||Died
|-
|Archibald Campbell, 10th Earl of Argyll||1685||1703||
|-
|Earl of Crawford (1398)||William Lindsay, 18th Earl of Crawford||1678||1698||
|-
|Earl of Erroll (1452)||John Hay, 12th Earl of Erroll||1674||1704||
|-
|Earl Marischal (1458)||George Keith, 8th Earl Marischal||1671||1694||
|-
|Earl of Sutherland (1235)||George Gordon, 15th Earl of Sutherland||1679||1703||
|-
|rowspan=2|Earl of Mar (1114)||Charles Erskine, Earl of Mar||1668||1689||Died
|-
|John Erskine, Earl of Mar||1689||1732||
|-
|rowspan=2|Earl of Rothes (1458)||John Leslie, 7th Earl of Rothes||1641||1681||Created Duke of Rothes, see above; died
|-
|Margaret Leslie, 8th Countess of Rothes||1681||1700||
|-
|rowspan=3|Earl of Morton (1458)||William Douglas, 9th Earl of Morton||1649||1681||Died
|-
|James Douglas, 10th Earl of Morton||1681||1686||Died
|-
|James Douglas, 11th Earl of Morton||1686||1715||
|-
|Earl of Menteith (1427)||William Graham, 8th Earl of Menteith||1661||1694||
|-
|Earl of Glencairn (1488)||John Cunningham, 11th Earl of Glencairn||1670||1703||
|-
|Earl of Eglinton (1507)||Alexander Montgomerie, 8th Earl of Eglinton||1669||1701||
|-
|Earl of Cassilis (1509)||John Kennedy, 7th Earl of Cassilis||1668||1701||
|-
|rowspan=2|Earl of Caithness (1455)||In dispute||1672||1681||
|-
|George Sinclair, 7th Earl of Caithness||1681||1698||
|-
|Earl of Buchan (1469)||William Erskine, 8th Earl of Buchan||1664||1695||
|-
|Earl of Moray (1562)||Alexander Stuart, 5th Earl of Moray||1653||1701||
|-
|Earl of Linlithgow (1600)||George Livingston, 3rd Earl of Linlithgow||1650||1690||
|-
|Earl of Winton (1600)||George Seton, 4th Earl of Winton||1650||1704||
|-
|rowspan=2|Earl of Home (1605)||James Home, 5th Earl of Home||1678||1687||Died
|-
|Charles Home, 6th Earl of Home||1687||1706||
|-
|Earl of Perth (1605)||James Drummond, 4th Earl of Perth||1675||1716||
|-
|Earl of Dunfermline (1605)||James Seton, 4th Earl of Dunfermline||1677||1690||
|-
|rowspan=2|Earl of Wigtown (1606)||William Fleming, 5th Earl of Wigtown||1668||1681||Died
|-
|John Fleming, 6th Earl of Wigtown||1681||1744||
|-
|rowspan=2|Earl of Abercorn (1606)||George Hamilton, 3rd Earl of Abercorn||1670||1680||Died
|-
|Claud Hamilton, 4th Earl of Abercorn||1680||1691||
|-
|Earl of Strathmore and Kinghorne (1606)||Patrick Lyon, 3rd Earl of Strathmore and Kinghorne||1646||1695||
|-
|rowspan=2|Earl of Roxburghe (1616)||Robert Ker, 3rd Earl of Roxburghe||1675||1682||
|-
|Robert Ker, 4th Earl of Roxburghe||1682||1696||
|-
|Earl of Kellie (1619)||Alexander Erskine, 4th Earl of Kellie||1677||1710||
|-
|rowspan=2|Earl of Haddington (1619)||Charles Hamilton, 5th Earl of Haddington||1669||1685||Died
|-
|Thomas Hamilton, 6th Earl of Haddington||1685||1735||
|-
|Earl of Nithsdale (1620)||Robert Maxwell, 4th Earl of Nithsdale||1677||1696||
|-
|Earl of Galloway (1623)||Alexander Stewart, 3rd Earl of Galloway||1671||1690||
|-
|Earl of Seaforth (1623)||Kenneth Mackenzie, 4th Earl of Seaforth||1678||1701||
|-
|Earl of Lauderdale (1624)||Charles Maitland, 3rd Earl of Lauderdale||1682||1691||Earldom previously held by the Duke of Lauderdale
|-
|Earl of Lothian (1631)||Robert Kerr, 2nd Earl of Lothian||1675||1703||
|-
|Earl of Airth (1633)||William Graham, 2nd Earl of Airth||1661||1694||
|-
|rowspan=2|Earl of Loudoun (1633)||James Campbell, 2nd Earl of Loudoun||1662||1684||Died
|-
|Hugh Campbell, 3rd Earl of Loudoun||1684||1731||
|-
|rowspan=2|Earl of Kinnoull (1633)||George Hay, 5th Earl of Kinnoull||1677||1687||Died
|-
|William Hay, 6th Earl of Kinnoull||1687||1709||
|-
|Earl of Dumfries (1633)||William Crichton, 2nd Earl of Dumfries||1643||1691||
|-
|Earl of Queensberry (1633)||William Douglas, 3rd Earl of Queensberry||1671||1695||Created Marquess of Queensberry in 1682, and Duke of Queensberry in 1684, see above
|-
|Earl of Stirling (1633)||Henry Alexander, 4th Earl of Stirling||1644||1691||
|-
|rowspan=2|Earl of Elgin (1633)||Robert Bruce, 2nd Earl of Elgin||1663||1685||Died
|-
|Thomas Bruce, 3rd Earl of Elgin||1685||1741||
|-
|rowspan=2|Earl of Southesk (1633)||Robert Carnegie, 3rd Earl of Southesk||1669||1688||Died
|-
|Charles Carnegie, 4th Earl of Southesk||1688||1699||
|-
|Earl of Traquair (1633)||Charles Stewart, 4th Earl of Traquair||1673||1741||
|-
|Earl of Ancram (1633)||Charles Kerr, 2nd Earl of Ancram||1654||1690||
|-
|Earl of Wemyss (1633)||Margaret Wemyss, 3rd Countess of Wemyss||1679||1705||
|-
|rowspan=2|Earl of Dalhousie (1633)||William Ramsay, 3rd Earl of Dalhousie||1674||1682||Died
|-
|George Ramsay, 4th Earl of Dalhousie||1682||1696||
|-
|Earl of Findlater (1638)||James Ogilvy, 3rd Earl of Findlater||1658||1711||
|-
|Earl of Airlie (1639)||James Ogilvy, 2nd Earl of Airlie||1665||1703||
|-
|rowspan=2|Earl of Carnwath (1639)||James Dalzell, 3rd Earl of Carnwath||1674||1683||Died
|-
|John Dalzell, 4th Earl of Carnwath||1683||1702||
|-
|rowspan=2|Earl of Callendar (1641)||Alexander Livingston, 2nd Earl of Callendar||1674||1685||Died
|-
|Alexander Livingston, 3rd Earl of Callendar||1685||1692||
|-
|Earl of Leven (1641)||David Leslie, 3rd Earl of Leven||1676||1728||
|-
|Earl of Dysart (1643)||Elizabeth Tollemache, 2nd Countess of Dysart||1654||1698||
|-
|rowspan=2|Earl of Panmure (1646)||George Maule, 3rd Earl of Panmure||1671||1686||Died
|-
|James Maule, 4th Earl of Panmure||1686||1716||
|-
|Earl of Selkirk (1646)||William Hamilton, 1st Earl of Selkirk||1646||1694||
|-
|Earl of Tweeddale (1646)||John Hay, 2nd Earl of Tweeddale||1653||1697||
|-
|rowspan=2|Earl of Northesk (1647)||David Carnegie, 3rd Earl of Northesk||1679||1688||Died
|-
|David Carnegie, 4th Earl of Northesk||1688||1729||
|-
|rowspan=2|Earl of Kincardine (1647)||Alexander Bruce, 2nd Earl of Kincardine||1662||1680||Died
|-
|Alexander Bruce, 3rd Earl of Kincardine||1680||1705||
|-
|Earl of Balcarres (1651)||Colin Lindsay, 3rd Earl of Balcarres||1662||1722||
|-
|Earl of Tarras (1660)||Walter Scott, Earl of Tarras||1660||1693||
|-
|rowspan=2|Earl of Aboyne (1660)||Charles Gordon, 1st Earl of Aboyne||1660||1681||Died
|-
|Charles Gordon, 2nd Earl of Aboyne||1681||1702||
|-
|Earl of Middleton (1660)||Charles Middleton, 2nd Earl of Middleton||1674||1695||
|-
|Earl of Newburgh (1660)||Charles Livingston, 2nd Earl of Newburgh||1670||1755||
|-
|Earl of Annandale and Hartfell (1661)||William Johnstone, 2nd Earl of Annandale and Hartfell||1672||1721||
|-
|Earl of Kilmarnock (1661)||William Boyd, 1st Earl of Kilmarnock||1661||1692||
|-
|Earl of Forfar (1661)||Archibald Douglas, 1st Earl of Forfar||1661||1712||
|-
|rowspan=2|Earl of Dundonald (1669)||William Cochrane, 1st Earl of Dundonald||1669||1685||Died
|-
|John Cochrane, 2nd Earl of Dundonald||1685||1690||
|-
|Earl of Dumbarton (1675)||George Douglas, 1st Earl of Dumbarton||1675||1692||
|-
|Earl of Kintore (1677)||John Keith, 1st Earl of Kintore||1677||1714||
|-
|Earl of Breadalbane and Holland (1677)||John Campbell, 1st Earl of Breadalbane and Holland||1677||1717||
|-
|Earl of Aberdeen (1682)||George Gordon, 1st Earl of Aberdeen||1682||1720||New creation
|-
|Earl of Melfort (1686)||John Drummond, 1st Earl of Melfort||1686||1695||New creation; also created Viscount of Melfort in 1685
|-
|Earl of Dunmore (1686)||Charles Murray, 1st Earl of Dunmore||1686||1710||New creation
|-
|Viscount of Falkland (1620)||Anthony Cary, 5th Viscount of Falkland||1663||1694||
|-
|Viscount of Dunbar (1620)||Robert Constable, 3rd Viscount of Dunbar||1668||1714||
|-
|Viscount of Stormont (1621)||David Murray, 5th Viscount of Stormont||1668||1731||
|-
|Viscount of Kenmure (1633)||Alexander Gordon, 5th Viscount of Kenmure||1663||1698||
|-
|rowspan=2|Viscount of Arbuthnott (1641)||Robert Arbuthnot, 2nd Viscount of Arbuthnott||1655||1682||Died
|-
|Robert Arbuthnot, 3rd Viscount of Arbuthnott||1682||1694||
|-
|rowspan=2|Viscount of Frendraught (1642)||William Crichton, 3rd Viscount of Frendraught||1678||1686||Died
|-
|Lewis Crichton, 4th Viscount of Frendraught||1686||1690||
|-
|Viscount of Oxfuird (1651)||Robert Makgill, 2nd Viscount of Oxfuird||1663||1706||
|-
|Viscount of Kingston (1651)||Alexander Seton, 1st Viscount of Kingston||1651||1691||
|-
|Viscount of Irvine (1661)||Arthur Ingram, 3rd Viscount of Irvine||1668||1702||
|-
|Viscount of Kilsyth (1661)||James Livingston, 2nd Viscount of Kilsyth||1661||1706||
|-
|Viscount Preston (1681)||Richard Graham, 1st Viscount Preston||1681||1695||New creation
|-
|Viscount of Newhaven (1681)||Charles Cheyne, 1st Viscount Newhaven||1681||1698||New creation
|-
|Viscount of Teviot (1685)||Robert Spencer, 1st Viscount Teviot||1685||1694||New creation
|-
|Viscount of Tarbat (1685)||George Mackenzie, 1st Viscount of Tarbat||1685||1714||New creation
|-
|rowspan=2|Viscount of Strathallan (1686)||William Drummond, 1st Viscount Strathallan||1686||1688||New creation; died
|-
|William Drummond, 2nd Viscount Strathallan||1688||1702||
|-
|rowspan=3|Viscount of Dundee (1688)||John Graham, 1st Viscount of Dundee||1688||1689||New creation; died
|-
|James Graham, 2nd Viscount of Dundee||1689||1689||Died
|-
|David Graham, 3rd Viscount of Dundee||1689||1690||
|-
|Lord Somerville (1430)||James Somerville, 11th Lord Somerville||1677||1693||
|-
|Lord Forbes (1442)||William Forbes, 11th Lord Forbes||1672||1697||
|-
|Lord Saltoun (1445)||Alexander Fraser, 11th Lord Saltoun||1669||1693||
|-
|Lord Gray (1445)||Patrick Gray, 8th Lord Gray||1663||1711||
|-
|Lord Sinclair (1449)||Henry St Clair, 10th Lord Sinclair||1676||1723||
|-
|rowspan=2|Lord Oliphant (1455)||Patrick Oliphant, 6th Lord Oliphant||1631||1680||Died
|-
|Charles Oliphant, 7th Lord Oliphant||1680||1709||
|-
|Lord Cathcart (1460)||Alan Cathcart, 6th Lord Cathcart||1628||1709||
|-
|Lord Lovat (1464)||Hugh Fraser, 9th Lord Lovat||1672||1696||
|-
|rowspan=2|Lord Sempill (1489)||Francis Sempill, 8th Lord Sempill||1675||1684||Died
|-
|Anne Abercromby, 9th Lady Sempill||1684||1695||
|-
|rowspan=2|Lord Ross (1499)||George Ross, 11th Lord Ross||1656||1682||Died
|-
|William Ross, 12th Lord Ross||1682||1738||
|-
|Lord Elphinstone (1509)||John Elphinstone, 8th Lord Elphinstone||1669||1718||
|-
|Lord Torphichen (1564)||Walter Sandilands, 6th Lord Torphichen||1649||1696||
|-
|Lord Lindores (1600)||John Leslie, 4th Lord Lindores||1666||1706||
|-
|rowspan=2|Lord Colville of Culross (1604)||John Colville, 4th Lord Colville of Culross||1656||1680||Died
|-
|Alexander Colville, 5th Lord Colville of Culross||1680||1717||
|-
|Lord Balmerinoch (1606)||John Elphinstone, 3rd Lord Balmerino||1649||1704||
|-
|Lord Blantyre (1606)||Alexander Stuart, 5th Lord Blantyre||1670||1704||
|-
|rowspan=2|Lord Balfour of Burleigh (1607)||John Balfour, 3rd Lord Balfour of Burleigh||1663||1688||Died
|-
|Robert Balfour, 4th Lord Balfour of Burleigh||1688||1713||
|-
|rowspan=2|Lord Cranstoun (1609)||James Cranstoun, 4th Lord Cranstoun||1664||1688||Died
|-
|William Cranstoun, 5th Lord Cranstoun||1688||1727||
|-
|Lord Maderty (1609)||David Drummond, 3rd Lord Madderty||1647||1692||Created Viscount Strathallan, see above
|-
|rowspan=2|Lord Dingwall (1609)||Elizabeth Preston, 2nd Lady Dingwall||1628||1684||Died
|-
|James Butler, 3rd Lord Dingwall||1684||1715||
|-
|Lord Cardross (1610)||Henry Erskine, 3rd Lord Cardross||1671||1693||
|-
|Lord Melville of Monymaill (1616)||George Melville, 4th Lord Melville||1643||1707||
|-
|Lord Jedburgh (1622)||Robert Ker, 4th Lord Jedburgh||1670||1692||
|-
|Lord Aston of Forfar (1627)||Walter Aston, 3rd Lord Aston of Forfar||1678||1714||
|-
|rowspan=2|Lord Fairfax of Cameron (1627)||Henry Fairfax, 4th Lord Fairfax of Cameron||1671||1688||Died
|-
|Thomas Fairfax, 5th Lord Fairfax of Cameron||1688||1710||
|-
|rowspan=2|Lord Napier (1627)||Archibald Napier, 3rd Lord Napier||1660||1683||Died
|-
|Margaret Brisbane, 5th Lady Napier||1683||1706||
|-
|rowspan=2|Lord Reay (1628)||John Mackay, 2nd Lord Reay||1649||1681||Died
|-
|George Mackay, 3rd Lord Reay||1681||1748||
|-
|Lord Cramond (1628)||Henry Richardson, 3rd Lord Cramond||1674||1701||
|-
|Lord Forbes of Pitsligo (1633)||Alexander Forbes, 2nd Lord Forbes of Pitsligo||1636||1690||
|-
|Lord Kirkcudbright (1633)||James Maclellan, 6th Lord Kirkcudbright||1678||1730||
|-
|rowspan=2|Lord Fraser (1633)||Andrew Fraser, 3rd Lord Fraser||1674||Abt 1680||Died
|-
|Charles Fraser, 4th Lord Fraser||Abt 1680||1715||
|-
|rowspan=2|Lord Forrester (1633)||William Baillie, 3rd Lord Forrester||1676||1681||Died
|-
|William Forrester, 4th Lord Forrester||1681||1705||
|-
|Lord Bargany (1641)||John Hamilton, 2nd Lord Bargany||1658||1693||
|-
|Lord Banff (1642)||George Ogilvy, 3rd Lord Banff||1668||1713||
|-
|rowspan=2|Lord Elibank (1643)||Patrick Murray, 3rd Lord Elibank||1661||1687||Died
|-
|Alexander Murray, 4th Lord Elibank||1687||1736||
|-
|rowspan=2|Lord Dunkeld (1645)||Thomas Galloway, 2nd Lord Dunkeld||1660||1684||
|-
|James Galloway, 3rd Lord Dunkeld||1684||1690||
|-
|rowspan=2|Lord Falconer of Halkerton (1646)||Alexander Falconer, 2nd Lord Falconer of Halkerton||1671||1684||Died
|-
|David Falconer, 3rd Lord Falconer of Halkerton||1684||1724||
|-
|Lord Abercrombie (1647)||James Sandilands, 2nd Lord Abercrombie||1658||1681||Died, title extinct
|-
|Lord Belhaven and Stenton (1647)||John Hamilton, 2nd Lord Belhaven and Stenton||1679||1708||
|-
|Lord Carmichael (1647)||John Carmichael, 2nd Lord Carmichael||1672||1710||
|-
|Lord Duffus (1650)||James Sutherland, 2nd Lord Duffus||1674||1705||
|-
|Lord Rollo (1651)||Andrew Rollo, 3rd Lord Rollo||1669||1700||
|-
|Lord Ruthven of Freeland (1650)||David Ruthven, 2nd Lord Ruthven of Freeland||1673||1701||
|-
|rowspan=2|Lord Rutherfurd (1661)||Archibald Rutherfurd, 3rd Lord Rutherfurd||1668||1685||Died
|-
|Robert Rutherfurd, 4th Lord Rutherfurd||1685||1724||
|-
|Lord Bellenden (1661)||John Bellenden, 2nd Lord Bellenden||1671||1707||
|-
|rowspan=2|Lord Newark (1661)||David Leslie, 1st Lord Newark||1661||1682||Died
|-
|David Leslie, 2nd Lord Newark||1682||1694||
|-
|Lord Burntisland (1672)||James Wemyss, Lord Burntisland||1672||1682||Died, title extinct
|-
|rowspan=2|Lord Nairne (1681)||Robert Nairne, 1st Lord Nairne||1681||1683||New creation, died
|-
|William Murray, 2nd Lord Nairne||1683||1716||
|-
|Lord Churchill of Eyemouth (1682)||John Churchill, 1st Lord Churchill of Eyemouth||1682||1722||New creation; created Earl of Marlborough in the Peerage of England, see above
|-
|rowspan=2|Lord Kinnaird (1682)||George Kinnaird, 1st Lord Kinnaird||1682||1689||New creation, died
|-
|Patrick Kinnaird, 2nd Lord Kinnaird||1689||1701||
|-
|Lord Glasford (1685)||Francis Abercromby, Lord Glasford||1685||1703||New creation; for life
|-
|}

Peerage of Ireland

|rowspan=2|Duke of Ormonde (1661)||James Butler, 1st Duke of Ormonde||1661||1688||Died
|-
|James Butler, 2nd Duke of Ormonde||1688||1715||
|-
|Marquess of Antrim (1645)||Randal MacDonnell, 1st Marquess of Antrim||1645||1683||Died, title extinct
|-
|Earl of Kildare (1316)||John FitzGerald, 18th Earl of Kildare||1664||1707||
|-
|Earl of Waterford (1446)||Charles Talbot, 12th Earl of Waterford||1667||1718||
|-
|rowspan=2|Earl of Clanricarde (1543)||William Burke, 7th Earl of Clanricarde||1666||1687||Died
|-
|Richard Burke, 8th Earl of Clanricarde||1687||1708||
|-
|Earl of Thomond (1543)||Henry O'Brien, 7th Earl of Thomond||1657||1691||
|-
|rowspan=3|Earl of Castlehaven (1616)||James Tuchet, 3rd Earl of Castlehaven||1630||1684||Died
|-
|Mervyn Tuchet, 4th Earl of Castlehaven||1684||1686||Died
|-
|James Tuchet, 5th Earl of Castlehaven||1686||1700||
|-
|Earl of Cork (1620)||Richard Boyle, 2nd Earl of Cork||1643||1698||
|-
|Earl of Antrim (1620)||Alexander MacDonnell, 3rd Earl of Antrim||1682||1699||Title previously held by the Marquess of Antrim
|-
|rowspan=2|Earl of Westmeath (1621)||Richard Nugent, 2nd Earl of Westmeath||1642||1684||Died
|-
|Richard Nugent, 3rd Earl of Westmeath||1684||1714||
|-
|rowspan=3|Earl of Roscommon (1622)||Wentworth Dillon, 4th Earl of Roscommon||1649||1685||Died
|-
|Carey Dillon, 5th Earl of Roscommon||1685||1689||Died
|-
|Robert Dillon, 6th Earl of Roscommon||1689||1715||
|-
|Earl of Londonderry (1622)||Robert Ridgeway, 4th Earl of Londonderry||1672||1714||
|-
|rowspan=2|Earl of Meath (1627)||William Brabazon, 3rd Earl of Meath||1675||1685||Died
|-
|Edward Brabazon, 4th Earl of Meath||1685||1707||
|-
|Earl of Barrymore (1628)||Richard Barry, 2nd Earl of Barrymore||1642||1694||
|-
|rowspan=2|Earl of Carbery (1628)||Richard Vaughan, 2nd Earl of Carbery||1634||1687||Died
|-
|John Vaughan, 3rd Earl of Carbery||1687||1713||
|-
|rowspan=2|Earl of Fingall (1628)||Luke Plunkett, 3rd Earl of Fingall||1649||1684||Died
|-
|Peter Plunkett, 4th Earl of Fingall||1684||1718||
|-
|rowspan=2|Earl of Desmond (1628)||William Feilding, 2nd Earl of Desmond||1665||1685||Died
|-
|Basil Feilding, 3rd Earl of Desmond||1685||1717||
|-
|rowspan=2|Earl of Ardglass (1645)||Thomas Cromwell, 3rd Earl of Ardglass||1668||1682||Died
|-
|Vere Essex Cromwell, 4th Earl of Ardglass||1682||1687||Died, title extinct
|-
|Earl of Donegall (1647)||Arthur Chichester, 3rd Earl of Donegall||1678||1706||
|-
|Earl of Cavan (1647)||Richard Lambart, 2nd Earl of Cavan||1660||1690||
|-
|Earl of Inchiquin (1654)||William O'Brien, 2nd Earl of Inchiquin||1674||1692||
|-
|Earl of Clancarty (1658)||Donough MacCarthy, 4th Earl of Clancarty||1676||1691||
|-
|rowspan=2|Earl of Orrery (1660)||Roger Boyle, 2nd Earl of Orrery||1679||1682||Died
|-
|Lionel Boyle, 3rd Earl of Orrery||1682||1703||
|-
|Earl of Mountrath (1660)||Charles Coote, 3rd Earl of Mountrath||1672||1709||
|-
|Earl of Drogheda (1661)||Henry Hamilton-Moore, 3rd Earl of Drogheda||1679||1714||
|-
|Earl of Carlingford (1661)||Nicholas Taaffe, 2nd Earl of Carlingford||1677||1690||
|-
|Earl of Mount Alexander (1661)||Hugh Montgomery, 2nd Earl of Mount Alexander||1663||1717||
|-
|Earl of Castlemaine (1661)||Roger Palmer, 1st Earl of Castlemaine||1661||1705||
|-
|Earl of Arran (1662)||Richard Butler, 1st Earl of Arran||1662||1686||Died, title extinct
|-
|Earl of Tyrone (1673)||Richard Power, 1st Earl of Tyrone||1673||1690||
|-
|Earl of Longford (1677)||Francis Aungier, 1st Earl of Longford||1677||1700||
|-
|Earl of Ranelagh (1677)||Richard Jones, 1st Earl of Ranelagh||1677||1711||
|-
|Earl of Bellomont (1680)||Charles Kirkhoven, 1st Earl of Bellomont||1680||1683||New creation; died, title extinct
|-
|Earl of Granard (1684)||Arthur Forbes, 1st Earl of Granard||1684||1695||New creation
|-
|Earl of Tyrconnell (1685)||Richard Talbot, 1st Earl of Tyrconnell||1685||1691||New creation
|-
|Earl of Limerick (1686)||William Dongan, 1st Earl of Limerick||1686||1698||New creation
|-
|Earl of Bellomont (1689)||Richard Coote, 1st Earl of Bellomont||1683||1701||New creation
|-
|Viscount Gormanston (1478)||Jenico Preston, 7th Viscount Gormanston||1643||1691||
|-
|Viscount Mountgarret (1550)||Richard Butler, 5th Viscount Mountgarret||1679||1706||
|-
|Viscount Grandison (1621)||George Villiers, 4th Viscount Grandison||1661||1699||
|-
|rowspan=2|Viscount Wilmot (1621)||Henry Wilmot, 3rd Viscount Wilmot||1658||1680||Died
|-
|Charles Wilmot, 4th Viscount Wilmot||1680||1681||Died, title extinct
|-
|rowspan=2|Viscount Valentia (1622)||Arthur Annesley, 2nd Viscount Valentia||1660||1686||Died
|-
|James Annesley, 3rd Viscount Valentia||1686||1690||
|-
|rowspan=2|Viscount Dillon (1622)||Lucas Dillon, 6th Viscount Dillon||1674||1682||Died
|-
|Theobald Dillon, 7th Viscount Dillon||1682||1690||
|-
|rowspan=2|Viscount Loftus (1622)||Edward Loftus, 2nd Viscount Loftus||1643||1680||Died
|-
|Arthur Loftus, 3rd Viscount Loftus||1680||1725||
|-
|Viscount Beaumont of Swords (1622)||Thomas Beaumont, 3rd Viscount Beaumont of Swords||1658||1702||
|-
|rowspan=2|Viscount Netterville (1622)||Nicholas Netterville, 3rd Viscount Netterville||1659||1689||Died
|-
|John Netterville, 4th Viscount Netterville||1689||1727||
|-
|rowspan=3|Viscount Magennis (1623)||Arthur Magennis, 3rd Viscount Magennis||1639||1683||Died
|-
|Hugh Magennis, 4th Viscount Magennis||1683||1684||Died
|-
|Bryan Magennis, 5th Viscount Magennis||1684||1692||
|-
|rowspan=2|Viscount Kilmorey (1625)||Thomas Needham, 6th Viscount Kilmorey||1668||1687||Died
|-
|Robert Needham, 7th Viscount Kilmorey||1687||1710||
|-
|Viscount Castleton (1627)||George Saunderson, 5th Viscount Castleton||1650||1714||
|-
|Viscount Killultagh (1627)||Edward Conway, 3rd Viscount Killultagh||1655||1683||Died, title extinct
|-
|rowspan=2|Viscount Mayo (1627)||Miles Bourke, 5th Viscount Mayo||1676||1681||Died
|-
|Theobald Bourke, 6th Viscount Mayo||1681||1741||
|-
|rowspan=2|Viscount Sarsfield (1627)||David Sarsfield, 3rd Viscount Sarsfield||1648||1687||Died
|-
|Dominick Sarsfield, 4th Viscount Sarsfield||1687||1691||
|-
|Viscount Chaworth (1628)||Patrick Chaworth, 3rd Viscount Chaworth||1644||1693||
|-
|Viscount Lumley (1628)||Richard Lumley, 2nd Viscount Lumley||1663||1721||
|-
|Viscount Molyneux (1628)||Caryll Molyneux, 3rd Viscount Molyneux||1654||1699||
|-
|Viscount Strangford (1628)||Philip Smythe, 2nd Viscount Strangford||1635||1708||
|-
|Viscount Scudamore (1628)||John Scudamore, 2nd Viscount Scudamore||1671||1697||
|-
|rowspan=2|Viscount Wenman (1628)||Philip Wenman, 3rd Viscount Wenman||1665||1686||Died
|-
|Richard Wenman, 4th Viscount Wenman||1686||1690||
|-
|Viscount FitzWilliam (1629)||Thomas FitzWilliam, 4th Viscount FitzWilliam||1670||1704||
|-
|Viscount Fairfax of Emley (1629)||Charles Fairfax, 5th Viscount Fairfax of Emley||1651||1711||
|-
|rowspan=3|Viscount Ikerrin (1629)||Pierce Butler, 2nd Viscount Ikerrin||1674||1680||Died
|-
|James Butler, 3rd Viscount Ikerrin||1680||1688||Died
|-
|Pierce Butler, 4th Viscount Ikerrin||1688||1711||
|-
|rowspan=2|Viscount Clanmalier (1631)||Lewis O'Dempsey, 2nd Viscount Clanmalier||1638||1683||Died
|-
|Maximilian O'Dempsey, 3rd Viscount Clanmalier||1683||1691||
|-
|rowspan=3|Viscount Cullen (1642)||Brien Cokayne, 2nd Viscount Cullen||1661||1687||Died
|-
|Charles Cokayne, 3rd Viscount Cullen||1687||1688||
|-
|Charles Cokayne, 4th Viscount Cullen||1687||1716||
|-
|Viscount Carrington (1643)||Francis Smith, 2nd Viscount Carrington||1665||1701||
|-
|rowspan=2|Viscount Tracy (1643)||John Tracy, 3rd Viscount Tracy||1662||1687||Died
|-
|William Tracy, 4th Viscount Tracy||1687||1712||
|-
|rowspan=2|Viscount Bulkeley (1644)||Robert Bulkeley, 2nd Viscount Bulkeley||1659||1688||Died
|-
|Richard Bulkeley, 3rd Viscount Bulkeley||1688||1704||
|-
|rowspan=2|Viscount Brouncker (1645)||William Brouncker, 2nd Viscount Brouncker||1645||1684||Died
|-
|Henry Brouncker, 3rd Viscount Brouncker||1684||1688||Died, title extinct
|-
|Viscount Ogle (1645)||William Ogle, 1st Viscount Ogle||1645||1682||Died, title extinct
|-
|rowspan=2|Viscount Barnewall (1646)||Henry Barnewall, 2nd Viscount Barnewall||1663||1688||Died
|-
|Nicholas Barnewall, 3rd Viscount Barnewall||1688||1725||
|-
|Viscount Galmoye (1646)||Piers Butler, 3rd Viscount of Galmoye||1667||1697||
|-
|Viscount Massereene (1660)||John Skeffington, 2nd Viscount Massereene||1665||1695||
|-
|Viscount Shannon (1660)||Francis Boyle, 1st Viscount Shannon||1660||1699||
|-
|rowspan=2|Viscount Fanshawe (1661)||Evelyn Fanshawe, 3rd Viscount Fanshawe||1674||1687||Died
|-
|Charles Fanshawe, 4th Viscount Fanshawe||1687||1710||
|-
|rowspan=2|Viscount Cholmondeley (1661)||Robert Cholmondeley, 1st Viscount Cholmondeley||1661||1681||Died
|-
|Hugh Cholmondeley, 2nd Viscount Cholmondeley||1681||1725||
|-
|Viscount Dungan (1662)||William Dongan, 1st Viscount Dungan||1662||1698||Created Earl of Limerick, see above
|-
|Viscount Dungannon (1662)||Lewis Trevor, 2nd Viscount Dungannon||1670||1693||
|-
|Viscount Clare (1662)||Daniel O'Brien, 3rd Viscount Clare||1670||1691||
|-
|Viscount Fitzhardinge (1663)||Maurice Berkeley, 3rd Viscount Fitzhardinge||1668||1690||
|-
|Viscount Charlemont (1665)||William Caulfeild, 2nd Viscount Charlemont||1671||1726||
|-
|Viscount Powerscourt (1665)||Folliott Wingfield, 1st Viscount Powerscourt||1665||1717||
|-
|Viscount Blesington (1673)||Murrough Boyle, 1st Viscount Blesington||1673||1718||
|-
|Viscount Granard (1675)||Arthur Forbes, 1st Viscount Granard||1675||1695||Created Earl of Granard, see above
|-
|rowspan=2|Viscount Lanesborough (1676)||George Lane, 1st Viscount Lanesborough||1676||1683||Died
|-
|James Lane, 2nd Viscount Lanesborough||1683||1724||
|-
|Viscount Downe (1680)||John Dawnay, 1st Viscount Downe||1680||1695||New creation
|-
|Viscount Rosse (1681)||Richard Parsons, 1st Viscount Rosse||1681||1703||New creation
|-
|Viscount Mountjoy (1683)||William Stewart, 1st Viscount Mountjoy||1683||1692||New creation
|-
|Viscount Lisburne (1685)||Adam Loftus, 1st Viscount Lisburne||1685||1691||New creation
|-
|Viscount Galway (1687)||Ulick Bourke, 1st Viscount Galway||1687||1691||New creation
|-
|Viscount Hewett (1687)||George Hewett, 1st Viscount Hewett||1689||1689||New creation; died, title extinct
|-
|Baron Athenry (1172)||Edward Bermingham, 13th Baron Athenry||1677||1709||
|-
|Baron Kingsale (1223)||Almericus de Courcy, 23rd Baron Kingsale||1669||1720||
|-
|Baron Kerry (1223)||William Fitzmaurice, 20th Baron Kerry||1661||1697||
|-
|Baron Slane (1370)||Christopher Fleming, 17th Baron Slane||1676||1691||
|-
|Baron Howth (1425)||Thomas St Lawrence, 13th Baron Howth||1671||1727||
|-
|rowspan=2|Baron Trimlestown (1461)||Robert Barnewall, 9th Baron Trimlestown||1667||1689||Died
|-
|Matthias Barnewall, 10th Baron Trimlestown||1689||1692||
|-
|Baron Dunsany (1462)||Christopher Plunkett, 10th Baron of Dunsany||1668||1690||
|-
|Baron Dunboyne (1541)||Pierce Butler, 5th/15th Baron Dunboyne||1662||1690||
|-
|Baron Louth (1541)||Matthew Plunkett, 7th Baron Louth||1679||1689||Outlawed
|-
|Baron Upper Ossory (1541)||Barnaby Fitzpatrick, 7th Baron Upper Ossory||1666||1691||
|-
|rowspan=2|Baron Bourke of Castleconnell (1580)||Thomas Bourke, 7th Baron Bourke of Connell||1665||1680||Died
|-
|William Bourke, 8th Baron Bourke of Connell||1680||1691||
|-
|Baron Cahir (1583)||Theobald Butler, 5th Baron Cahir||1676||1700||
|-
|Baron Hamilton (1617)||Claud Hamilton, 5th Baron Hamilton of Strabane||1668||1691||
|-
|Baron Bourke of Brittas (1618)||Theobald Bourke, 3rd Baron Bourke of Brittas||1668||1691||
|-
|rowspan=2|Baron Castle Stewart (1619)||John Stewart, 5th Baron Castle Stewart||1662||1685||Died
|-
|Robert Stewart, 6th Baron Castle Stewart||1685||1686||Died; title dormant
|-
|Baron Folliot (1620)||Thomas Folliott, 2nd Baron Folliott||1622||1697||
|-
|Baron Maynard (1620)||William Maynard, 2nd Baron Maynard||1640||1699||
|-
|Baron Gorges of Dundalk (1620)||Richard Gorges, 2nd Baron Gorges of Dundalk||1650||1712||
|-
|rowspan=2|Baron Digby (1620)||Simon Digby, 4th Baron Digby||1677||1685||Died
|-
|William Digby, 5th Baron Digby||1685||1752||
|-
|Baron Fitzwilliam (1620)||William Fitzwilliam, 3rd Baron Fitzwilliam||1658||1719||
|-
|rowspan=2|Baron Blayney (1621)||Henry Vincent Blayney, 5th Baron Blayney||1670||1689||Died
|-
|William Blayney, 6th Baron Blayney||1689||1705||
|-
|rowspan=2|Baron Brereton (1624)||William Brereton, 3rd Baron Brereton||1664||1680||Died
|-
|John Brereton, 4th Baron Brereton||1680||1718||
|-
|Baron Herbert of Castle Island (1624)||Henry Herbert, 4th Baron Herbert of Castle Island||1678||1691||
|-
|Baron Baltimore (1625)||Charles Calvert, 3rd Baron Baltimore||1675||1715||
|-
|Baron Coleraine (1625)||Henry Hare, 2nd Baron Coleraine||1667||1708||
|-
|Baron Sherard (1627)||Bennet Sherard, 2nd Baron Sherard||1640||1700||
|-
|rowspan=2|Baron Alington (1642)||William Alington, 3rd Baron Alington||1659||1685||Died
|-
|Giles Alington, 4th Baron Alington||1685||1691||
|-
|rowspan=2|Baron Hawley (1646)||Francis Hawley, 1st Baron Hawley||1646||1684||Died
|-
|Francis Hawley, 2nd Baron Hawley||1684||1743||
|-
|Baron Kingston (1660)||Robert King, 2nd Baron Kingston||1676||1693||
|-
|rowspan=2|Baron Coote (1660)||Richard Coote, 1st Baron Coote||1660||1683||Died
|-
|Richard Coote, 2nd Baron Coote||1683||1701||Created Earl of Bellomont, see above
|-
|Baron Barry of Santry (1661)||Richard Barry, 2nd Baron Barry of Santry||1673||1694||
|-
|Baron Hamilton of Glenawly (1661)||William Hamilton, 2nd Baron Hamilton of Glenawly||1679||1680||Died, title extinct
|-
|Baron Altham (1681)||Altham Annesley, 1st Baron Altham||1681||1699||New creation
|-
|Baron Bellew of Duleek (1686)||John Bellew, 1st Baron Bellew of Duleek||1686||1693||New creation
|-
|Baron Shelburne (1688)||Elizabeth Petty, Baroness Shelburne||1688||1708||New creation
|-
|Baron Shelburne (1688)||Charles Petty, 1st Baron Shelburne||1688||1696||New creation
|-
|}

References

 

1680
1680s in England
1680s in Ireland
1680s in Scotland
Peers
Peers
Peers
1680
Peers
Peers